Carolina Krafzik (born 27 March 1995) is a German track and field athlete who specializes in the 400 metres hurdles and 400 metres. She represented Germany at the 2019 World Athletics Championships, competing in women's 400 metres hurdles.

She won a gold medal in 400 metres hurdles at the 2019 German Athletics Championships.

References

External links

1995 births
Living people
People from Enzkreis
Sportspeople from Karlsruhe (region)
German female hurdlers
German female sprinters
World Athletics Championships athletes for Germany
German national athletics champions
Athletes (track and field) at the 2020 Summer Olympics
Olympic athletes of Germany
20th-century German women
21st-century German women